Semljicola lapponicus is a spider species found in Scandinavia, Russia and Alaska.

See also 
 List of Linyphiidae species (Q–Z)

References 

Linyphiidae
Spiders of Europe
Spiders of Russia
Spiders of North America
Spiders described in 1939